The 2015 Morocco Tennis Tour – Mohammedia was a professional tennis tournament played on clay courts. It was the second edition of the tournament which was part of the 2015 ATP Challenger Tour. It took place in Mohammedia, Morocco between 5 and 10 October 2015.

Singles main-draw entrants

Seeds

 1 Rankings are as of September 28, 2015.

Other entrants
The following players received wildcards into the singles main draw:
  Hicham Khaddari
  Taha Tifnouti
  Jaume Munar
  Yassine Idmbarek

The following players received entry from the qualifying draw:
  Kamil Majchrzak
  Laslo Đere
  Stefanos Tsitsipas
  Jozef Kovalík

The following player received entry as a lucky loser:
  Claudio Fortuna

Champions

Singles

 Roberto Carballés Baena def.  Kamil Majchrzak, 7–6(7–4), 6–2

Doubles

 Íñigo Cervantes /  Mark Vervoort def.  Roberto Carballés Baena /  Pablo Carreño Busta, 3–6, 7–6(7–2), [12–10]

References

Morocco Tennis Tour - Mohammedia
Morocco Tennis Tour – Mohammedia
2015 Morocco Tennis Tour